A530 may refer to:

 A530 road (Great Britain)
 Canon A530, a camera
 HNoMS Horten (A530), a boat